The 2018 Giro d'Italia was the 101st edition of the Giro d'Italia, one of cycling's Grand Tours. The first half of the Giro began on 4 May in Jerusalem, Israel, with an individual time trial, and ended with Stage 11, a hilly stage to Osimo, occurring on 16 May; the second half of the tour started at Osimo on 17 May and finished in Rome on 27 May.

Stage 1
4 May 2018 – Jerusalem to Jerusalem,  (ITT)

The first rider departed at 13:50 local time (UTC+03:00). The route started alongside the David Citadel Hotel, headed south and then west to the first timecheck, which was at the  mark. The riders then turned back east and passed the Knesset.

Stage 2
5 May 2018 – Haifa to Tel Aviv,

Stage 3
6 May 2018 – Beersheba to Eilat,

Rest day 1
7 May 2018 – Catania

During the morning, the riders and support staff transferred across the Mediterranean Sea, from Eilat in Israel to Catania in Sicily. This involved up to an hour of bus travel, and a further three hours by aircraft.

Stage 4
8 May 2018 – Catania to Caltagirone,

Stage 5
9 May 2018 – Agrigento to Santa Ninfa,

Stage 6
10 May 2018 – Caltanissetta to Mount Etna, 

The riders departed from Caltanissetta, heading east to Enna and then turning south to Piazza Armerina. The race then continued east through Ramacca and Paternò.

Stage 7
11 May 2018 – Pizzo to Praia a Mare,

Stage 8
12 May 2018 – Praia a Mare to Montevergine, 

The race departed northwest along the coast to Sapri, then heading inland and west to Licusati. The route again reached the coast after heading northwest to an intermediate sprint at Agropoli, and continued along the coast to another intermediate sprint at Salerno. From Salerno, the route began a gentle climb to Bellizzi Irpino.

Stage 9
13 May 2018 – Pesco Sannita to Gran Sasso, 

Rest day 2
14 May 2018 – Montesilvano

Stage 10
15 May 2018 – Penne to Gualdo Tadino,

Stage 11
16 May 2018 – Assisi to Osimo,

References

2018 Giro d'Italia
Giro d'Italia stages